The Handbook of Electrochemistry, edited by Cynthia Zoski, is a sourcebook containing a wide range of electrochemical information. It provides details of experimental considerations, typical calculations, and illustrates many of the possibilities open to electrochemical experimentators.

The book has five sections: Fundamentals, Laboratory Practical, Techniques, Applications, and Data - and each contains a series of entries by a range of scholars.

External links
 Elsevier's page for the Handbook of Electrochemistry 

Chemistry books